The Tapirapé are an indigenous people of Brazil

Tapirapé may also refer to:

 Tapirapé Biological Reserve
Tapirapé language, the language of the Tapirapé people
 Tapirapé River (Mato Grosso), Brazil
 Tapirapé River (Pará), Brazil